The Fishdam River is a  river on the Upper Peninsula of Michigan in the United States. It is a tributary of Big Bay de Noc on Lake Michigan.

See also
List of rivers of Michigan

References

Michigan  Streamflow Data from the USGS

Rivers of Michigan
Rivers of Delta County, Michigan
Tributaries of Lake Michigan